Sabulodes spoliata is a species of geometrid moth in the family Geometridae. It is found in North America.

The MONA or Hodges number for Sabulodes spoliata is 7003.

Subspecies
These three subspecies belong to the species Sabulodes spoliata:
 Sabulodes spoliata berkleyata Wright, 1917
 Sabulodes spoliata lagunata Cassino & Swett, 1923
 Sabulodes spoliata spoliata

References

Further reading

 

Ourapterygini
Articles created by Qbugbot
Moths described in 1908